is a 2015 action role-playing video game developed by Gust and published by Koei Tecmo for the PlayStation 3, PlayStation 4, PlayStation Vita and Microsoft Windows. The PlayStation 4 version received a North American release on March 29, 2016, with a European release following on April 1, 2016, and a Microsoft Windows release on February 7, 2017.

The game was followed up by a sequel titled Nights of Azure 2: Bride of the New Moon, released August 2017 in Japan, and October 2017 worldwide.

Gameplay
The game features an RPG battle system where characters fight alongside contracted demons known as Servan. These demons can be summoned during battle through the use of SP, and are categorized into attacker and support types. As they become stronger through subsequent battles, they gain new abilities. The player accepts quests and performs customisations at the hotel, when not taking orders to progress the story or battling enemies.

Arnice, the main playable character, can also land attack chains using light, heavy and special attacks, with each chain gradually filling a transformation gauge. When gauge is full, the player can trigger a transformation which increases her offensive power. This demon form allows her to control flames, while her rabbit form focuses on speed and melee combat, and her phantom form improves her recovery capabilities. She is also able to transform her blood into creating different types of blood power weapons depending on the situation, such as daggers and longswords, which change her attack moveset and the abilities of summoned demons.

The game also contains an optional arena where players can take on various challenges and earn rewards, and these include battles with special restrictions placed upon them and fighting against enemies within a labyrinth.

Setting
The game follows the journey of two girls and is set on the imaginary island-kingdom of Ruswal, where nights are plagued by Azure-blooded demons, where no one sleeps at night. Although it is dangerous for humans to leave their homes after dark, the brave knights known as the Curia are trained to fend off the ever growing threat. After humans emerged victorious from the battle against the demonic Nightlord many years ago, the blue blood from the monster scattered and polluted those who bathed in it, changing them into creatures known as fiends, which steal night-time from the people. Arnice although has polluted blood, remained her heart intact.

Characters
: The protagonist of the game, who is a holy knight serving a mysterious organization known as the "Curia." She is part human and part monster, having had contact with the blue blood of the Nightlord, and she has a bloodsucking ability which arises from her monster side, and can use her own blood to create a demon sword. Voiced by Mao Ichimichi.
: A saint who is destined to seal what remains of the Nightlord, and is a close friend of Arnice. Voiced by Hiromi Igarashi.
: A pure-blooded demon that lives within the opera house. Voiced by Tomoyo Kurosawa.
: A hotel manager and cafe owner. Voiced by Masaki Terasoma.
: A member of the holy knights and Arnice's senior. Voiced by Ayane Sakura.
: A self-declared researcher of monsters. Voiced by Yoshitsugu Matsuoka.
: A merchant who is a realist. He is well-informed with apparitions and the Curia, and has a hidden side. Voiced by Satoshi Hino.
: A bewitching, pure-blooded apparition who leads visitors astray with her sweet fragrance. She seemingly seeks for the soul of the Nightlord, although she is currently secluded to her palace. Voiced by Eriko Matsui.

Development
The game was developed under the leadership of development producer Keisuke Kikuchi who has previously worked on the Deception and Fatal Frame game series, while the general producer was Tadanobu Inoue. The character sprites and background art were illustrated by Yoshiku.
The game, along with the other Social Gust game, Atelier Sophie, experienced delays in release citing final adjustments as the reason for delay.

First-print copies of the game featured DLC codes for Gust from Hyperdimension Neptunia as a subordinate demon.

Reception

Famitsu gave the game a review score of 32/40. The game sold a total of 79,227 physical retail copies across all three platforms within its first week of release in Japan.

Upon its PS4 release in the West, Nights of Azure received mixed reception.

Notes

References

External links

2015 video games
Action role-playing video games
Fiction about diseases and disorders
Gust Corporation games
LGBT-related video games
PlayStation 3 games
PlayStation 4 games
PlayStation Vita games
Single-player video games
Koei Tecmo games
Video games about demons
Video games about vampires
Video games developed in Japan
Video games featuring female protagonists
Video games with alternate endings
Windows games
2017 video games
Nintendo Switch games